Oxalis debilis, the large-flowered pink-sorrel or pink woodsorrel, is a perennial plant and herb in the family Oxalidaceae. Its original distribution is South America but has become a very cosmopolitan species, occurring in all continents except Antarctica. It can be found in both temperate and tropical areas.

The flowers, leaves and roots are edible.  There is concern that the plant should only be consumed in small amounts because it contains oxalic acid that can cause calcium deficiency if eaten in larger amounts.  Studies show that this is an exaggerated fear.  The leaves have what is considered a zesty lemony flavor.

Description 
It is a bulbous plant. The fruit is a capsule. The seeds are projected, with an elastic integument. In Europe the plants are sterile and are propagating only by bulbs.

Research on the naturalizing populations in China show the presence of 2 flower morphs, pollen with low viability and polyploidy.

Varieties and cultivation 
There are two varieties:
 Oxalis debilis var. corymbosa (DC.) Lourteig – large-flowered pink-sorrel (Synonym : O. corymbosa)
 Oxalis debilis var. debilis

'Aureoreticulata' ('aureo-reticulata') has attractive variegated leaves with flowers that are pinkish purple. This cultivar is also named ‘Gold Veined Oxalis’ (Yellow Vein Oxalis) with attractive yellow vein foliage. The symptom is associated with the presence of a begomovirus. This virus, designated OxYVV, is transmitted by the whitefly Bemisia tabaci.

The Royal Horticultural Society advises that it can be a serious weed.

Pests and diseases 
Puccinia oxalidis is a fungus species in the genus Puccinia. This species is a causal agent of rust on plants in the genus Oxalis.

See also 
 List of the vascular plants of Britain and Ireland 6
 List of vascular plants of Norfolk Island

References 

 . W. H. A. von Humboldt et al., Nov. gen. sp. 5:183[folio]; 5:236[quarto]. 1822

External links 

debilis
Plants described in 1822
Flora of South America